Subaugusta is an underground station on Line A of the Rome Metro. This station in located in Piazza di Cinecittà, at the intersection of Via Tuscolana with Viale Tito Labieno and Via Orazio Pulvillo.

References

Rome Metro Line A stations
Rome Q. XXIV Don Bosco
Rome Q. XXV Appio Claudio